Wards Cove Packing Company was a cannery located in the community of Ward Cove, on the northern outskirts of the larger city of Ketchikan in the U.S. state of Alaska. The original Wards Cove Cannery was established in 1928, on Ward Cove and operated several Alaskan salmon canneries, employing about 200 people during the peak season. The company closed in 2004, and was sold to non-fishing interests.

The impetus for the Civil Rights Act of 1991 was partially based upon the 1989 legal case, Wards Cove Packing Co. v. Atonio.

See also
 List of canneries

References

Bibliography
 

1928 establishments in Alaska
Food and drink companies established in 1928
2004 disestablishments in Alaska
Food and drink companies disestablished in 2004
Buildings and structures in Ketchikan Gateway Borough, Alaska
Seafood canneries
Defunct companies based in Alaska
Fishing in the United States